Codex Vindobonensis Mexicanus I, also known as Codex Vindobonensis C, or Codex Mexicanus I is an accordion-folded pre-Columbian piece of Mixtec writing. It is a ritual-calendrical and genealogical document dated to the 14th century.

Contents 
Codex Vindobonensis has 52 pages with size 26.5 by 22 cm. It was composed in a form of harmony with length 13.5 m. Its weight is 2.687 kg. The text is divided into 10 major sections. In the beginning it presents mythological genealogies of gods. It also contains lists of Mixtec rulers and priests.

History 
It is not certain where the codex was discovered. It was likely discovered in Veracruz and sent to Sevilla, together with the manuscript Codex Zouche-Nuttall, as a gift for Charles V in 1519.  The later story of the codex is not well known, but it traveled to Portugal, Rome, Weimar, and finally Vienna.

The manuscript frequently changed owners and places in which it was housed. As a result, its name was changed 18 times. It was known as Codex Constantinopolitanus, Codex Byzantinus, and Codex Mexicanus I. The last name is more often used in the present day.

It is currently housed at the Austrian National Library at Vienna.

See also 
 Mixtec writing
 Mixtec Group

Further reading 
 Codex Vindobonensis Mexicanus I: A commentary Institute for Mesoamerican Studies, State University of New York at Albany (1978).
 Walter Lehmann and Ottokar Smital, Codex Vindobonensis Mexicanus 1. Faksimileausgabe der Mexikanischen Bilderhandschrift der Nationalbibliothek in Wien (Vienna, 1929).
 Facsimile: Codex Vindobonensis Mexicanus 1; Vienna, Austrian National Library, Cod. Vindob. mex. 1, Akademische Druck- u. Verlagsanstalt (ADEVA) Graz 1974. Colour facsimile edition of the great Mixtec manuscript of the Austrian National Library. 52 fol. on 65 pp., size: 265 x 220 mm, total length: 13,5 metres. Introduction (in English): O. Adelhofer, Vienna, 44 pp. (history of the manuscript, bibliography). Screenfold-facsimile and commentary volume encased in box with leather spine.

External links 
 High Definition scan of the codex at the Austrian National Library
 Elizabeth P. Benson, Dumbarton Oaks, Mesoamerican writing systems, Washington 1973 
 British Museum:  Codex Vienna (facsimile) / Codex Vindobonensis (facsimile) / Codex Vindobonensis Mexicanus 1 (facsimile)

Mixtec codices
14th-century manuscripts
Manuscripts of the Austrian National Library